Cosmic Rift was a two-dimensional massively multiplayer video game designed by lead programmer Jeff Petersen.  It is based in a science fiction universe wherein players can fly from an overhead view one of 13 spaceships, each with their own strengths and unique weapons, in a variety of gaming zones each with a different objective.

History 

Cosmic Rift is provided as part of the Station Pass package offered by Sony Online Entertainment, which also includes Infantry and Tanarus.  Its gameplay is comparable to Virgin Interactive Entertainment's Subspace, another two-dimensional space shooter written by Jeff Petersen prior to joining Sony's team. Today, Subspace remains available in a freeware flavor known as Continuum.

Cosmic Rift was released as an open beta in April 2001, which lasted until May 2002.  From this point forward players were required to pay a monthly fee to gain full access to any of the Station Pass games, with limited capability permitted to non-subscribers.

One of the largest draws for subscribers was the 4 on 4 league which sustained the generally low popularity of the game until August 2004, when the league completed its sixth and final season.  The remaining subscribers lingered for approximately one year playing only in the Rift Ball league (see zone description below) until August 2005.  Since the end of this league, the Cosmic Rift's player base had been essentially non-existent.

On May 23, 2007, it was announced that the Station Pass games would become completely free as of June 26, 2007. A map editor for both Cosmic Rift and Infantry were also being worked on in hopes to have them publicly released by the time the three Station Pass games are made free. This announcement had initially prompted an increase in the population of the game's servers. Despite these efforts, however, the game's population still remained largely insubstantial.

Closing
On March 1 of 2012 Sony Online Entertainment announced that Cosmic Rift, Infantry, Star Chamber: The Harbinger Saga, and EverQuest Online Adventures were to come to close on March 29, 2012.

The reason given by Sony Online Entertainment for the closings was that development resources for those titles would be better put to use on developing newer games.

Gaming Zones 

 Alpha Zone: Team or solo free for all with no objective but to destroy any enemy ships, intended for beginners.
 Chaos Zone: Team or solo free for all with no objective but to destroy any enemy ships, intended for experts.
 Conquest: Teams are associated with a particular base, which they must defend, while simultaneously attempting to overwhelm the bases of opposing teams.
 CRPL: Stands for Cosmic Rift Players League, organized four on four matches with limited lives for each player.
 Dueling Zone: Intended for solo one on one matches, with small team or free for all combat permitted.
 Rift Ball: Two teams compete in a format similar to soccer, the objective is to score goals with a Rift Ball that is passed between ships.  Combat is permitted while controlling this ball.
 Rogue Trader: An RPG based game where the objective is to earn money via gathering minerals, and destroying enemy ships.  The money can be used to purchase improvements to one's ship that remain persistent across multiple sessions.
Scrimmage 
 Seek and Destroy: One player possesses a flag, and the opposing players must attempt to destroy this particular ship which then moves control of the flag to the killer.  Victory goes to the team which holds the flag for a set period of time.
 Speed Zone: Objective is to destroy as many enemy ships possible in a limited time frame.
 Super Fortress: Eight flags which are randomly distributed across the map must be gathered by a team and held for a set period of time.
 Total War: Two teams face against each other with the intent to destroy the opposing team's base.  The base comes equipped with computer-controlled turrets.
 Gravity Well: This zone is currently not online, but the premise consists of multiple gravity wells that will destroy one's craft, and weapons that will be awarded for destroying other ships.

References

External links
Cosmic Rift website

2001 video games
Products and services discontinued in 2012
Massively multiplayer online games
Video games developed in the United States
Windows games
Windows-only games
Inactive massively multiplayer online games